The 1995 Turkmenistan Higher League (Ýokary Liga) season was the fourth season of Turkmenistan's professional football league. Six teams competed in the 1995 season.

Results

External links
 

Ýokary Liga seasons
Turk
Turk
1995 in Turkmenistani football